Mananasy is a rural municipality in Madagascar. It belongs to the district of Soavinandriana, which is a part of Itasy Region. The population of the commune was estimated to be approximately 16,000 in 2001 commune census.

Primary and junior level secondary education are available in town. The majority 90% of the population of the commune are farmers, while an additional 5% receives their livelihood from raising livestock. The most important crop is rice, while other important products are beans and maize. Services provide employment for 5% of the population.

Roads
Mananasy is linked to the National road 43 by a Provincial road (RIP 103) from Soavinandriana (13km) in a very bad state of conservation. Only motocycles & tractors are able to pass. Though this road is being renovated in 2022.

Lakes
The Andranomavo Lake, a volcanic crater lake.

References 

Populated places in Itasy Region